is a 2002 historical drama film directed by Yōjirō Takita loosely based on real historical events. When the Last Sword Is Drawn won the Best Film award at the 2004 Japanese Academy Awards, as well as the prizes for Best Actor (Kiichi Nakai) and Best Supporting Actor (Kōichi Satō). It received a further eight nominations.

Synopsis
The film tells the story of two Shinsengumi samurai. Saitō Hajime (played by Kōichi Satō) is a heartless killer. Yoshimura Kanichiro (played by Kiichi Nakai) appears to be a money-grabbing and emotional swordsman from the northern area known as Nambu Morioka.

The main storyline is set during the fall of the Tokugawa shogunate, but it is told in a series of flashbacks as Saitō and another man reminisce. The themes include conflicting loyalty to the clan, lord, and family.

More than just swordplay, it is the story of a man willing to do anything for the good of his family, even if it means never being able to see them.

Cast
Kiichi Nakai — Yoshimura Kanichiro
Kōichi Satō — Saitō Hajime
Yui Natsukawa — Shizu/Mitsu
Takehiro Murata — Ono Chiaki
Miki Nakatani — Nui
Yuji Miyake — Ohno Jiroemon
Sansei Shiomi —  Kondō Isami
Eugene Nomura —  Hijikata Toshizo
Masato Sakai — Okita Soji
Atsushi Itō — Young Chiaki Ono
Kanji Tsuda — Ōkubo Toshimichi
Hideaki Itō — Tokugawa Yoshinobu

References

External links
 
 
 
 
 
 
 

2002 films
Films directed by Yōjirō Takita
Films scored by Joe Hisaishi
Picture of the Year Japan Academy Prize winners
Samurai films
Shochiku films
Films based on Japanese novels
Cultural depictions of Tokugawa Yoshinobu
Films set in Bakumatsu
2000s Japanese films